Moose Mountain Lake is a reservoir in the Canadian Province of Saskatchewan. It is located in the RM of Golden West No. 95 in the Prairies Ecozone of Palliser's Triangle at the western edge of Moose Mountain Upland. Moose Mountain Creek is both the primary inflow and outflow of the lake; it enters at the north end and leaves at the dam in the south end. A secondary inflow that comes from Gooseberry Lake enters on the western side near the south end.

The lake runs at a diagonal in a north to east direction and is about seven miles long while less than a mile wide. The total surface area is 395 hectares and the shoreline measures 28 kilometres. It was formed in 1937 with the damming of Moose Mountain Creek and is situated in the Moose Mountain Creek valley, which was created during the last ice age.

Parks and recreation
Near the dam, along the lake, there is a small park with a picnic area and boat launch called Lost Horse Hills Heritage Park. It is named after the nearby Lost Horse Hills. Fishing in the lake is popular and northern pike are a common fish species found in the lake.

At the northern end, where Moose Mountain Creek flows into the lake, is Saint Clair National Wildlife Area, which is one of 28 Prairie National Wildlife Areas in Saskatchewan.

Moose Mountain Dam

Moose Mountain Dam is an earthen dam built in 1937. It is owned and operated by the Saskatchewan Water Security Agency (WSA). The building of the dam created the reservoir called Moose Mountain Lake that holds about 11.5 million cubic metres of water. The reservoir is used for irrigation, flood control, recreation, and as a wildlife and fish habitat. In 2012, the WSA spent more than $1.7 million in upgrades to the dam. Part of the upgrade was to build a fish passageway to allow migrating fish access to the reservoir. On 26 September 2012, the minister responsible for the Saskatchewan Watershed Authority, Ken Cheveldayoff said,

Gallery

See also
List of lakes of Saskatchewan
List of dams and reservoirs in Canada
Geography of Saskatchewan
2011 Souris River flood

References

External links

Dams in Saskatchewan
Lakes of Saskatchewan
Golden West No. 95, Saskatchewan
Division No. 1, Saskatchewan